Nem chua is a fermented pork dish from Vietnamese cuisine. It is mainly composed of a mixture of lean pork and thin strips of cooked rind, garnished with garlic and chilli. It can take the form of bite-size pieces wrapped individually in aluminum foil and paper, or a kind of cervelat in sealed plastic. It has a sweet-sour taste characteristic of lactic fermentations, a beautiful pink color and a firm and elastic texture.

In Vietnam, it is generally eaten raw, but European health rules make it recommended to cook the products sold there. It has a shelf life of less than a week and is often consumed in raw form after the fermentation process. It is a popular food in different parts of Southeast Asia, in various preparations, seasonings and flavors, mainly sour and spicy. Nem chua is used as an ingredient in various dishes and is also served raw in its raw form as a side dish.

Preparation 

Nem chua is prepared from lean pork, pounded and mixed with the rind cut into thin strips after being cooked. Depending on the production, you can add garlic, chilli and/or an aromatic plant leaf (chum ruot, giremblier leaf). The nem chua is packaged away from the air, in foil, aluminum foil or in plastic. It is then kept at room temperature to allow the fermentation process.

Advanced fermentation results in acidification which calls this variant nem chua (« sour nem »), with lighter fermentation producing nem ngọt (« sweet nem »).

Marketing in the West 

In France and Belgium, nem chua is frequently found on the market because it corresponds to the food tastes of people from the South, the majority among the Vietnamese diaspora. Nem chua are sold in Asian stores in the form of small square packets, wrapped in pink paper, in nets of 10 pieces, or in the form of a large sausage of 200 g in plastic. There are two dates that correspond to the maturation of meat (start and end dates). They are consumed between the two dates, often as an apéritif, accompanied by beer. Package inserts in Europe recommend consuming the product cooked.

Health risk 

Attention : Although this recipe is highly appreciated by its fans, it is likely that it is only moderately tolerated [not clear] by health authorities, firstly because of the risk of contamination by pathogenic bacteria in poorly controlled fermentations. Then, in the case of bites, it happens that the acidity developed in the meat attacks the aluminium foil packaging. This problem does not arise with plastic-wrapped versions.

Nem chua are usually accompanied by a notice indicating that the bites must be kept in the refrigerator and cooked for at least 20 minutes, whereas cold storage slows down maturation and Asians often eat this product raw.

References

See also

Nem (disambiguation)
Vietnamese cuisine

Vietnamese cuisine
Pork dishes